Stara Wieś-Stasin  is a village in the administrative district of Gmina Łęczna, within Łęczna County, Lublin Voivodeship, in eastern Poland.

The village has a population of 160.

References

Villages in Łęczna County